The 1997 Paris–Nice was the 55th edition of the Paris–Nice cycle race and was held from 9 March to 16 March 1997. The race started in Neuilly-sur-Seine and finished in Nice. The race was won by Laurent Jalabert of the ONCE team.

General classification

References

1997
1997 in road cycling
1997 in French sport
March 1997 sports events in Europe